Ashish Dhawan (born March 10, 1969) is an Indian private equity investor and philanthropist who co-founded and ran one of India's leading private equity funds, Chrysalis Capital (ChrysCapital). He has served on the company's board since 1999, but left his full-time position at ChrysCapital in 2012 after twenty years in the investment management business to found Central Square Foundation (CSF), a grant-making organization and policy think tank focused on transforming the quality of school education in India.  In 2014, he spearheaded the launch of India's first liberal arts university, Ashoka University, a philanthropic effort of over forty leaders in education and industry.

In 2012, Dhawan was recognized as the NextGen Leader in Philanthropy by Forbes India for his charitable work.  He also placed 15th on the 2014 Hurun India Philanthropy List, a ranking of the most generous individuals in India produced by China-based Hurun Research Institute. His net worth is approximately $800 million.

References

1969 births
Harvard Business School alumni
Living people
Yale University alumni
Indian chief executives
Indian investors